The 1895 North Carolina Tar Heels football team represented the University of North Carolina during the 1895 college football season.  They played nine games with a final record of 7–1–1. The team captain for the 1895 season was Edwin Gregory. The team went 3–0–1 on a 6-day, 4 game road trip.

Schedule

Season summary

North Carolina A&M
The season opened with a defeat of the rival A and M college by a 36–0 score Nicklin had runs of 57, 67, and 80 yards.

The starting lineup was Gregory (left end), Steele (left tackle), Hurley (left guard), White (center), Collier (right guard), Wright (right tackle), Merritt (right ed), Whitaker (quarterback), Nicklin (left halfback), Moore (right halfback), McRae (fullback).

Richmond
The Tar Heels beat the winless Richmond Spiders 34–0.

Georgia

The Georgia Bulldogs, coached by Pop Warner, were defeated 6–0  what some claim is the very first (legal or otherwise; the legal pass starts in 1906) forward pass.

Bob Quincy notes in his 1973 book They Made the Bell Tower Chime:
"John Heisman, a noted historian, wrote 30 years later that, indeed, the Tar Heels had given birth to the forward pass against the Bulldogs (UGA). It was conceived to break a scoreless deadlock and give UNC a 6–0 win. The Carolinians were in a punting situation and a Georgia rush seemed destined to block the ball. The punter, with an impromptu dash to his right, tossed the ball and it was caught by George Stephens, who ran 70 yards for a touchdown." The ball was thrown out of desperation by back Dr. Joel Whitaker.  Georgia coach Pop Warner complained to the referee that the play was illegal, however, the referee let the play stand because he did not see the pass. Only 4 minutes of game time had passed when Stephens scored. Governor William Y. Atkinson attended the game.

Vanderbilt

Carolina outcoached Vanderbilt on its way to a 12–0 victory. Butler had a punt return for a touchdown. The game was called due to darkness.

Sewanee
The Sewanee Tigers fought UNC to a scoreless tie.

Georgia again
The Georgia and Carolina teams played a second time to round out the road trip and North Carolina won 10–6.

Washington and Lee
The Tar Heels defeated Washington and Lee Generals 16–0.

VAMC
North Carolina beat VAMC in Charlotte, North Carolina with 1,000 looking on.  North Carolina scored three touchdowns in the first half and then scored two more touchdowns in the second half.  VAMC then drove to North Carolina's three-yard line, but was stopped on downs.  The final score was 5–32.

The starting lineup was Gregory (left end), Wright (left tackle), Hurley (left guard), White (center), Collier (right guard), Baird (right tackle), Merritt (right ed), Stanley (quarterback), Nicklin (left halfback), Moore (right halfback), Butler (fullback).

Virginia
Virginia defeated North Carolina 10–6 in this year's version of the South's Oldest Rivalry. Virginia thereby claims a Southern championship.

Players

Varsity lettermen
First award:
Richard Busbee
George Phineas Butler, fullback
Thomas Hurley, guard
Lawrence MacRae, end
Samuel Strong Nicklin, halfback
Robert Thomas Stephens Steele, guard/end
Joel D. Whitaker, Jr., quarterback
Joseph Harvey Wright, center
Robert Herring Wright, tackle
Second award:
James Andrew Baird, tackle
Harris Taylor Collier, guard
Edwin Clarke Gregory, end
John Allen Moore, halfback
George Stephens, halfback
Third award:
Thomas Allen Sharpe, center
Benjamin Edward Stanley, quarterback 
Fourth award:
William Daniel Merritt, end

References

North Carolina
North Carolina Tar Heels football seasons
North Carolina Tar Heels football